Shad Bagh (Punjabi) is a union council and neighbourhood in Shalamar Tehsil of Lahore, Punjab, Pakistan. Shad Bagh is a predominantly mixed residential and commercial area.

Localities
Goal Bagh 
Afzal Park, Fazal Park
Government Girls high School Shad Bagh 
Government college for Woman Shad Bagh 
Government High School Amir Road
Sajjad Colony, Amir Road
Feroze Bagh
Scheme No.2
Toka wala Chowk
Fawara Chowk
Nawaz Sharif Bagh
Gol Bagh
Tajpura Bagh
Akram Park
China Scheme Bagh
Chiragh Bagh
Chaudhry Bagh
Naya Shadbagh
Tajpura Ground
Nabi Bakhsh Bagh
Taj Bagh
Chohdary Park
Allama Usman Arshad Park

Constituencies
 National Assembly: NA-124
 Provincial Assembly: PP-147 Lahore–IV

References

External links
 Introduction to Union Administration - City government of Lahore
 Google Maps

Shalamar Zone